Thendara is a hamlet and census-designated place (CDP) in Herkimer County, New York, United States. Thendara is located in the Adirondack Park, in the southern part of the town of Webb, west of Old Forge on Route 28.

Thendara is a station on the Adirondack Railroad; it is the current terminus of most northbound trains from Utica. It was formerly known as "Fulton Chain", and was the junction of the Fulton Chain Railway with the Mohawk and Malone Railway (the latter now used by the scenic railroad). The New York Central Railroad Adirondack Division Historic District was added to the National Register of Historic Places in 1993. The Thendara Historic District was listed in 2010.

Thendara was the site of early efforts to settle the town of Webb in 1811, but the effort failed.

Gallery

References

Hamlets in New York (state)
Utica–Rome metropolitan area
Census-designated places in Herkimer County, New York
National Register of Historic Places in Herkimer County, New York
Historic districts on the National Register of Historic Places in New York (state)
Hamlets in Herkimer County, New York